Pindall can refer to:
 Xenophon Overton Pindall, Governor of Arkansas, 1907-1909
 Pindall, Arkansas